The discography of American rapper Wale consists of seven studio albums, three compilation albums, ten mixtapes, one extended play, sixty-five singles (including twenty-seven as a featured artist), two promotional singles and forty-one music videos. In 2005, Wale started his music career by releasing mixtapes in the Washington, D.C. area. His debut mixtape was titled Paint a Picture. Following that, Wale released his second mixtape in 2006, Hate Is the New Love. In the same year, Wale signed with a local record label in Studio 43. In 2007 Wale was discovered by Mark Ronson, and was signed by Allido Records, which released his third mixtape, 100 Miles & Running, featuring artist Daniel Merriweather.

In 2008, Wale was signed by Interscope Records, which released his fourth mixtape, The Mixtape About Nothing, which is Seinfeld-themed. In 2009, Wale also released his debut studio album, Attention Deficit, which contains three singles, "Chillin", featuring Lady Gaga, "Pretty Girls", featuring Gucci Mane, and Weensey, and "World Tour", featuring Jazmine Sullivan. After going on tour with Jay-Z in 2009, Wale became a managed artist of Jay-Z's recording label, Roc Nation, to help with all management duties. In that same year, he released his fifth mixtape, Back to the Feature. In 2010, he released his sixth (and second Seinfeld-themed) mixtape, More About Nothing under his own independent label, The Board Administration.

In 2011, Wale signed to Maybach Music Group where a compilation album named Self Made Vol. 1 was released. It topped R&B/Hip-Hop Albums, and Top Rap Albums, while peaking a number five on the Billboard 200 chart. Wale released his second studio album, Ambition, on November 1, 2011. It peaked at number two on the Billboard 200, and topped R&B/Hip-Hop Albums as well as Top Rap Albums.

Albums

Studio albums

Collaborative albums

Mixtapes

Extended plays

Singles

As lead artist

As featured artist

Promotional singles

Other charted songs

Guest appearances 
{| class="wikitable plainrowheaders" style="text-align:center;"
|+ List of non-single guest appearances, with other performing artists, showing year released and album name
! scope="col" style="width:20em;"| Title
! scope="col"| Year
! scope="col"| Other artist(s)
! scope="col"| Album
|-
! scope="row"| "Is There Any Love"
| 2008
| Kid Cudi
| Man on the Moon: The End of Day
|-
! scope="row"| "So Close, So Far"
| rowspan="3"| 2010
| Statik Selektah, Bun B, Colin Munroe
| 100 Proof: The Hangover
|-
! scope="row"| "The Greatness"
| Raheem DeVaughn
| The Love & War MasterPeace
|-
! scope="row"| "You Got It"
| J. Cole
| Friday Night Lights
|-
! scope="row"| "Pretty Bitches"
| rowspan="6"| 2011
| Gucci Mane
| The Return of Mr. Zone 6
|-
! scope="row"| "Future"
| DJ Khaled, Ace Hood, Meek Mill, Big Sean, Vado
| We the Best Forever
|-
! scope="row"| "All the Way Gone"
| Game, Mario
| The R.E.D. Album
|-
! scope="row"| "Never See You Again"
| DJ Drama, Talia Coles
| Third Power
|-
! scope="row"| "Into the Morning"
| Roscoe Dash
| J.U.I.C.E.
|-
! scope="row"| "Marilyn Monroe" (Remix)
| Brianna Perry
| Face Off
|-
! scope="row"| "Go Girl"
| rowspan="27"| 2012
| Yo Gotti, Big K.R.I.T., Big Sean, Wiz Khalifa
| Live from the Kitchen
|-
! scope="row"| "IRENE"
| Mitchelle'l
| IRENE
|-
! scope="row"| "Kings & Queens"
| Tyga, Nas
| Careless World: Rise of the Last King
|-
! scope="row"| "Rack City" (Remix)
| Tyga, Fabolous, Jeezy, Meek Mill, T.I.
| 
|-
! scope="row"| "Take a Chance"
| Monica
| New Life
|-
! scope="row"| "Paper Tags"
| Jadakiss, French Montana, Styles P
| rowspan="2"| Consignment
|-
! scope="row"| "Turn Up"
| Jadakiss, Future
|-
! scope="row"| "Take U Home"
| Meek Mill, Big Sean
| rowspan="2"| Dreamchasers 2
|-
! scope="row"| "House Party" (Remix)
| Meek Mill, Mac Miller, Fabolous
|-
! scope="row"| "5 AM"
| Black Cobain, Tre
| Cheers
|-
! scope="row"| "South Side"
| Shy Glizzy
| Law
|-
! scope="row"| "Diced Pineapples"
| Rick Ross, Drake
| God Forgives, I Don't
|-
! scope="row"| "Don't Pay 4 It"
| DJ Khaled, Tyga, Mack Maine, Kirko Bangz
|Kiss the Ring
|-
! scope="row"| "Life Should Go On"
| Big Sean
| Detroit
|-
! scope="row"| "All of Me"
| Lloyd
|The Playboy Diaries Vol. 1
|-
! scope="row"| "Turnt"
| Waka Flocka Flame, Roscoe Dash
| Salute Me or Shoot Me 4 (Banned from America)
|-
! scope="row"| "Trung (Let's Get Down)"
| Skrillex
| 
|-
! scope="row"| "Disqualified"
| Yo Gotti
| Cocaine Muzik 7: The World Is Yours
|-
! scope="row"| "Lay Up"
| Meek Mill, Rick Ross, Trey Songz
| Dreams and Nightmares
|-
! scope="row"| "True"
| Freeway
|Diamond In the Ruff
|-
! scope="row"| "Rich Hipster"
| Chrisette Michele
| Audrey Hepburn: An Audiovisual Presentation
|-
! scope="row"| "Don't Go Over There"
| French Montana, Fat Joe
| rowspan="3"|Mac & Cheese 3
|-
! scope="row"| "Thrilla In Manilla"
| French Montana, Tyga
|-
! scope="row"| "Dance Move"
| French Montana, Fabolous
|-
! scope="row"| "Beauty"
| Fabolous
| The S.O.U.L. Tape 2
|-
! scope="row"| "Stripper"
| Game
| rowspan="2" 
|-
! scope="row"| "Represent"
| Lil Durk
|-
! scope="row"| "Awesome"
| rowspan="25"| 2013
| Juelz Santana
| God Will'n
|-
! scope= "row"|"Bad Ass"
|  Kid Ink, Meek Mill
| Almost Home
|-
! scope="row"| "Ceelo"
| Future 
| F.B.G.: The Movie
|-
! scope="row"| "DC To tha Bay"
| Mistah F.A.B.
| I Found My Backpack 3
|-
! scope="row"| "Fuck Ya Friend" 
| Uncle Murda, French Montana
| The First 48
|-
! scope="row"| "Ceelo" 
| DJ Scream, Future, Ludacris
| The Ratchet Superior
|-
! scope="row"| "Only You Can Tell It"
| Pusha T
| Wrath of Caine
|-
! scope="row"| "Pass Around"
| Young Scooter, Gucci Mane
| Juughouse
|-
! scope="row"| "Throw Hunnids"
| L.D.
| Owls & Spaceships
|-
! scope="row"| "Quintana"
| Travis Scott
| Owl Pharaoh
|-
! scope="row"| "Til The Sun Up"
| Funkmaster Flex
| rowspan="2"| Who You Mad At? Me or Yourself?
|-
! scope="row"| "No Lackin"
| Funkmaster Flex, Lil Reese, Waka Flocka Flame
|-
! scope="row"| "Waiting" (Remix)
| Adrian Marcel
| rowspan="2" 
|-
! scope="row"| "Freaks" (Remix)
| French Montana, Nicki Minaj, Rick Ross, Mavado, DJ Khaled 
|-
! scope="row"| "Understand Me"
| Problem
| The Separation
|-
! scope="row"| "Winter Schemes"
| J. Cole
| 
|-
! scope="row"| "Dark Knights"
| Rapsody
| She Got Game
|-
! scope="row"| "I.O.U." (Remix)
| Luke James
| Made to Love
|-
! scope="row"| "What It Do"
| Kirko Bangz
| Progression III
|-
! scope="row"| "Seasonal Love" 
| Sean Kingston
| Back 2 Life
|-
! scope="row"| "FDB" (Remix)
| Young Dro, B.o.B, Chief Keef
| 
|-
! scope="row"| "Anything Goes"
| Audio Push
| Come As You Are
|-
! scope="row"| "I'm Still"
| DJ Khaled, Ace Hood, Chris Brown, Wiz Khalifa
| Suffering from Success
|-
! scope="row"| "Tipsy"
| Ice Prince, Morell
| Fire of Zamani
|-
! scope="row"| "Respect That You Earn"
| Yo Gotti, Ne-Yo 
| I Am
|-
! scope="row"| "Bennie and the Jets"
| rowspan="5"| 2014
| Elton John, Miguel
| Goodbye Yellow Brick Road (40th Anniversary Celebration)
|-
! scope="row"| "Not Your Man" (Remix)
| Professor Green, Thabo
| 
|-
! scope="row"| "Used To It"
| Gucci Mane
| Gucci Vs. Guwop
|-
! scope="row"| "Thirsty" (Remix)
| PARTYNEXTDOOR
| 
|-
! scope="row"|"Murder" 
| Wizkid
| Ayo
|-
! scope="row"| "It's Yo Shit"
| rowspan="6"| 2015
| Chris Brown, Tyga
| Fan of a Fan: The Album
|-
! scope="row"| "Like A Drum"
| Jamie Foxx
| Hollywood: A Story of a Dozen Roses
|-
! scope="row"| "BRRRR"
| Fat Trel, Rick Ross
| Georgetown
|-
! scope="row"| "Marvin Gaye" (Remix)
| Charlie Puth
| 
|-
! scope="row"| "Beautiful Lie"
| Rick Ross
| Black Dollar
|-
! scope="row"| "All I Need"
| Chris Brown
| Before the Party
|-
! scope="row"| "Forgive Me Father"
| rowspan="3"| 2016
| DJ Khaled, Meghan Trainor, Wiz Khalifa
| Major Key
|-
! scope="row"| "What Now"
| Chocolate Droppa, BJ The Chicago Kid, Chaz French
| Kevin Hart: What Now? (The Mixtape Presents Chocolate Droppa)
|-
! scope="row"| "Show Off"
| Pete Rock, Smoke DZA
| Don't Smoke Rock
|-
! scope="row"| "If I Told You That I Love You"
| rowspan="5" | 2017
|Steve Aoki
|Kolony
|-
! scope="row"| "Get Down"
| Statik Selektah, Phil Ade
| 8
|-
! scope="row"| "Voilà"
|N.E.R.D, Gucci Mane
|No One Ever Really Dies
|-
! scope="row"| "Cee Cee From DC"
|T-Pain
|Oblivion
|-
! scope="row"| "Way Up"
|Stokley
|Introducing Stokley
|-
! scope="row"| "Too Much"
| rowspan="6" | 2018
|YFN Lucci
|Ray Ray from Summertime
|-
! scope="row"| "G.O.A.T. 2.0"
| Eric Bellinger 
|Eazy Call
|-
! scope="row"| "Tear Drops"
| Roscoe Dash
| 5thy5ive
|-
! scope="row"| "This My Summer"
| Fiend
|''Still Cookin|-
! scope="row"| "OMG"
| IDK
| IDK & Friends :)
|-
! scope="row"| "100 Miles and Running"
| Logic, John Lindahl
|YSIV
|-
! scope="row"| "Something Real"
| rowspan="6" |2019
| Adé, GoldLink
| Always Something
|-
! scope="row"| "Act a Fool"
| Rick Ross
| Port of Miami 2
|-
! scope="row"| "Your Side, My Side"
| Lightshow
| If These Walls Could Talk 2
|-
! scope="row"| "Champagne"
| Eric Bellinger, Guapdad 4000
| Saved by the Bellinger
|-
! scope="row"| "Hallelujah"
| Buddy, A$AP Ferg
| Godfather of Harlem
|-
! scope="row"| "Private Jet"
| J. Stone
| The Definition of Loyalty
|-
! scope="row"| "French Toast"
| 2020
| Westside Gunn, Joyce Wrice
| Pray for Paris
|-
! scope="row"|"Note to Self"
| rowspan="2" | 2021
| Russ, Big Sean, Joey Badass
| Chomp 2
|-
! scope="row"| "Warm Words in a Cold World"
| Rick Ross, Future
| Richer Than I Ever Been
|}

Music videos
As lead artist

 Notes 

 References GeneralSpecific'''

External links 
 
 

Discographies of American artists
Hip hop discographies
Rhythm and blues discographies